Yevhen Kopyl (born 25 May 1986 in Kyiv) is a Ukrainian footballer who currently plays for Zorya Luhansk.

References
 
 

1986 births
Living people
Ukrainian footballers
Ukrainian expatriate footballers
Expatriate footballers in Poland
Zagłębie Sosnowiec players
FC Dynamo Kyiv players
Association football goalkeepers
FC Zorya Luhansk players
Footballers from Kyiv